Vincent Arnardi (born 10 July 1957) is a French sound engineer. He was nominated for an Academy Award in the category Best Sound for the film Amélie. He has worked on more than 200 films since 1978.

Selected filmography
 Amélie (2001)

References

External links

1957 births
Living people
French audio engineers
People from Hyères
César Award winners